Immunological memory is the ability of the immune system to quickly and specifically recognize an antigen that the body has previously encountered and initiate a corresponding immune response. Generally, these are secondary, tertiary and other subsequent immune responses to the same antigen. The adaptive immune system and antigen-specific receptor generation (TCR, antibodies) are responsible for adaptive immune memory. After the inflammatory immune response to danger-associated antigen, some of the antigen-specific T cells and B cells persist in the body and become long-living memory T and B cells. After the second encounter with the same antigen, they recognize the antigen and mount a faster and more robust response.  Immunological memory is the basis of vaccination. Emerging resources show that even the innate immune system can initiate a more efficient immune response and pathogen elimination after the previous stimulation with a pathogen, respectively with PAMPs or DAMPs. Innate immune memory (also called trained immunity) is neither antigen-specific nor dependent on gene rearrangement, but the different response is caused by changes in epigenetic programming and shifts in cellular metabolism. Innate immune memory was observed in invertebrates as well as in vertebrates.

Adaptive immune memory

Development of adaptive immune memory 
Immunological memory occurs after a primary immune response against the antigen. Immunological memory is thus created by each individual, after a previous initial exposure, to a potentially dangerous agent. The course of secondary immune response is similar to primary immune response. After the memory B cell recognizes the antigen it presents the peptide: MHC II complex to nearby effector T cells. That leads to activation of these cells and rapid proliferation of cells. After the primary immune response has disappeared, the effector cells of the immune response are eliminated. However, there remain antibodies previously created in the body that represent the humoral component of immunological memory and comprise an important defensive mechanism in subsequent infections. In addition to the formed antibodies in the body there remains a small number of memory T and B cells that make up the cellular component of the immunological memory. They stay in blood circulation in a resting state and at the subsequent encounter with the same antigen these cells are able to respond immediately and eliminate the antigen. Memory cells have a long life and last up to several decades in the body.

Immunity to chickenpox, measles, and some other diseases lasts a lifetime. Immunity to many diseases eventually wears off. The immune system's response to a few diseases, such as dengue, counterproductively makes the next infection worse (antibody-dependent enhancement).

As of 2019, researchers are still trying to find out why some vaccines produce life-long immunity, while the effectiveness of other vaccines drops to zero in less than 30 years (for mumps) or less than six months (for H3N2 influenza).

Evolution of adaptive immune memory
The evolutionary invention of memory T and B cells is widespread; however, the conditions required to develop this costly adaptation are specific. First, in order to evolve immune memory the initial molecular machinery cost must be high and will demand losses in other host characteristics. Second, middling or long lived organisms have higher chance of evolving such apparatus. The cost of this adaption increases if the host has a middling lifespan as the immune memory must be effective earlier in life.

Furthermore, research models show that the environment plays an essential role in the diversity of memory cells in a population. Comparing the influence of multiple infections to a specific disease as opposed to disease diversity of an environment provide evidence that memory cell pools accrue diversity based on the number of individual pathogens exposed, even at the cost of efficiency when encountering more common pathogens.  Individuals living in isolated environments such as islands will have a less diverse population of memory cells, but present with sturdier immune responses. This indicates that the environment plays a large role in the evolution of memory cell populations.

Previously acquired immune memory can be depleted by measles in unvaccinated children, leaving them at risk of infection by other pathogens in the years after infection.

Memory B cells 

Memory B cells are plasma cells that are able to produce antibodies for a long time. Unlike the naive B cells involved in the primary immune response the memory B cell response is slightly different. The memory B cell has already undergone clonal expansion, differentiation and affinity maturation, so it is able to divide multiple times faster and produce antibodies with much higher affinity (especially IgG). In contrast, the naive plasma cell is fully differentiated and cannot be further stimulated by antigen to divide or increase antibody production. Memory B cell activity in secondary lymphatic organs is highest during the first 2 weeks after infection. Subsequently, after 2 to 4 weeks its response declines. After the germinal center reaction the memory plasma cells are located in the bone marrow which is the main site of antibody production within the immunological memory.

Memory T cells 

Memory T cells can be both CD4+ and CD8+. These memory T cells do not require further antigen stimulation to proliferate; therefore, they do not need a signal via MHC. Memory T cells can be divided into two functionally distinct groups based on the expression of the CCR7 chemokine receptor. This chemokine indicates the direction of migration into secondary lymphatic organs. Those memory T cells that do not express CCR7 (these are CCR7-) have receptors to migrate to the site of inflammation in the tissue and represent an immediate effector cell population. These cells were named memory effector T cells (TEM). After repeated stimulation they produce large amounts of IFN-γ, IL-4 and IL-5. In contrast, CCR7 + memory T cells lack proinflammatory and cytotoxic function but have receptors for lymph node migration. These cells were named central memory T cells (TCM). They effectively stimulate dendritic cells, and after repeated stimulation they are able to differentiate in CCR7- effector memory T cells. Both populations of these memory cells originate from naive T cells and remain in the body for several years after initial immunization.

Innate immune memory
Many invertebrates such as species of fresh water snails, copepod crustaceans, and tapeworms have been observed activating innate immune memory to instigate a more efficient immune response to second encounter with specific pathogens, despite missing an adaptive branch of the immune system. RAG1-deficient mice without functional T and B cells were able to survive the administration of a lethal dose of Candida albicans when exposed previously to a much smaller amount, showing that vertebrates also retain this ability. Despite not having the ability to manufacture antibodies like the adaptive immune system, innate immune system has immune memory properties as well. Innate immune memory (trained immunity) is defined as a long-term functional reprogramming of innate immune cells evoked by exogenous or endogenous insults and leading to an altered response towards a second challenge after returning to a non-activated state. When innate immune cells receive an activation signal, for example, through recognition of PAMPs with PRRs, they start the expression of proinflammatory genes, initiate an inflammatory response, and undergo epigenetic reprogramming. After the second stimulation, the transcription activation is faster and more robust. Immunological memory  was reported in monocytes, macrophages, NK cells, ILC1, ILC2, and recently in  ILC3 as well, Concomitantly, some nonimmune cells, for example, epithelial stem cells on barrier tissues, or fibroblasts, change their epigenetic state and respond differently after priming insult.

Mechanism of innate immune memory 
At the steady state, unstimulated cells have reduced biosynthetic activities and more condensed chromatin with reduced gene transcription. The interaction of exogenous PAMPs (β-glucan, muramyl peptide) or endogenous DAMPs (oxidized LDL, uric acid) with PRR initiates a cellular response. Triggered Intracellular signaling cascades lead to the upregulation of metabolic pathways such as glycolysis, Krebs cycle, and fatty acid metabolism. An increase in metabolic activity provides cells with energy and building blocks, which are needed for the production of signaling molecules such as cytokines and chemokines. Signal transduction changes the epigenetic marks and increases chromatin accessibility, to allow binding of transcription factors and start transcription of genes connected with inflammation. There is an interplay between metabolism and epigenetic changes because some metabolites such as fumarate and acetyl-CoA can activate or inhibit enzymes involved in chromatin remodeling. After the stimulus let up, there is no need for immune factors production, and their expression in immune cells is terminated. Several epigenetic modifications created during stimulation remain. Characteristic epigenetic rewiring in trained cells is the accumulation of  H3K4me3 on immune genes promoters and the increase of H3k4me1 and H3K27ac on enhancers. Additionally, cellular metabolism doesn't return to the state before stimulation, and trained cells remain in a prepared state. This status can last from weeks to several months and can be transmitted into daughter cells. Secondary stimulation induces a new response, which is faster and stronger.

Evolution of innate immune memory 
Immune memory brings a big evolutionary advantage when the organism is facing repeated infections. Inflammation is very costly and increased effectivity of response accelerates pathogen elimination and prevents damage to the host's own tissue. Classical adaptive immune memory evolved in jawed vertebrates and in jawless fish (lamprey), which is approximately just 1% of living organisms. It is not a surprise that we can report some form of immune memory in other species. In plants and invertebrates, we can see faster kinetics, increased magnitude of immune response and improved survival rate after secondary infection encounters. Immune memory is common for the vast majority of biodiversity on earth. It has been proposed that immune memory in innate and adaptive immunity represents an evolutionary continuum in which a more robust immune response evolved first, mediated by epigenetic reprogramming. In contrast, specificity through antigen-specific receptors evolved later in some vertebrates.

See also
 Immunity (medical)
 Immunity debt
 Seroconversion
 Serostatus
 Virgin soil epidemic

References

Immune system